Niall Stanage (born 18 June 1974) is a Northern Irish journalist and associate editor of the American political newspaper, The Hill.

Biography
Stanage was born in 1974 in Belfast, Northern Ireland and attended Carryduff Primary School and Methodist College Belfast. He describes his upbringing thus: "I was the product of a family that identified primarily as Irish rather than British — and that was nominally Protestant, yet in reality secular". He went on to read English at St Edmund Hall, Oxford, graduating in 1995. In the 1990s, he performed as a singer-songwriter, playing acoustic guitar and harmonica at various live gigs across the British Isles.

Stanage is a former editor of Magill and a regular contributor to the New York Observer, while also covering the United States for The Sunday Business Post. He has written for Salon, The Wall Street Journal, The Guardian and the Irish Independent, among other publications. He is a frequent guest on The Stand with Eamon Dunphy podcast. He is currently Associate Editor of The Hill.

In The Guardian in 2006, Stanage argued in opposition to George Monbiot, who had written that the Iraqi insurgency was comparable to the IRA:

Stanage wrote Redemption Song: An Irish Reporter Inside the Obama Campaign, which was officially released on 1 December 2008. This was one of the first books published anywhere to cover the entirety of Barack Obama's 2008 campaign for the Presidency of the United States.

References

External links
Niall Stanage, Twitter.
Comment is Free articles. The Guardian.

1974 births
Living people
Alumni of St Edmund Hall, Oxford
Irish Independent people
Irish magazine editors
Journalists from Belfast
Magill people
People educated at Methodist College Belfast
The Guardian journalists
Business Post people
Columnists from Northern Ireland
Male non-fiction writers from Northern Ireland